The 2020 Uzbekistan Cup was the 28th season of the annual Uzbekistan Cup, the knockout football cup competition of Uzbekistan.

The cup winner is guaranteed a place in the 2021 AFC Champions League.

First qualifying round
The draw for the first qualifying round was held on 13 June 2020. The eight teams which play in the 2020 Uzbekistan Pro League enter this round.

Second qualifying round
The draw for the second qualifying round was held on 23 June 2020. The four teams which advance from the first qualifying round play in this round.

Round of 16
The draw for the round of 16 was held on 14 November 2020. The two teams which advance from the second qualifying round joined by fourteen teams from 2020 Uzbekistan Super League.

Quarter-finals
The draw for the quarter-finals was held on 8 December 2020. The eight teams which advance from the round of 16 play in this round.

Semi-finals
The draw for the semi-finals was held on 12 December 2020. The four teams which advance from the quarter-finals play in this round.

Final

References

External links

Uzbek Cup News, (Russian)
Uzbek Cup Results, (Russian)
Soccerway.com

Cup
Uzbekistan
Uzbekistan Cup